Vyacheslav Mikhailovich Kuznetsov (29 June 1962 – 14 August 2011) was a Russian professional football coach and a player.

Club career
He made his professional debut in the Soviet Second League in 1979 for FC Rotor Volgograd. He played 1 game in the 1994–95 UEFA Cup for FC Tekstilshchik Kamyshin.

References

1962 births
2011 deaths
Soviet footballers
Russian footballers
Association football midfielders
Russian Premier League players
FC Rotor Volgograd players
FC Energiya Volzhsky players
FC Tekstilshchik Kamyshin players
Russian football managers
FC Tekstilshchik Kamyshin managers